Austin Kelly was the bandleader of the All-Ireland Irish Orchestra, a traditional Irish musical group based out of Philadelphia, Pennsylvania.  The band's recordings were broadcast on the WTEL radio station in Philadelphia, which helped inspire the modern Irish music scene in the city.

References
 Standing Stones

American bandleaders
Year of birth missing
Year of death missing